David Jones (birth unknown) is a Welsh former rugby union and professional rugby league footballer who played in the 1960s.

International honours
David Jones won 2 caps for Wales (RL) in 1968–1969 while at Halifax.

References

Living people
Footballers who switched code
Halifax R.L.F.C. players
Maesteg RFC players
Rugby league centres
Rugby league players from Maesteg
Rugby league wingers
Wales national rugby league team players
Welsh rugby league players
Welsh rugby union players
Year of birth missing (living people)